Neilrex is a bounded rural locality in north-western New South Wales, Australia. A now-removed railway station on the Gwabegar railway line was located there between 1917 and 1974. Wheat silos and a siding remain in use.

References

Localities in New South Wales
Warrumbungle Shire